Saadullah Jan Barq (born 11 May 1940) is a Pakistani poet, columnist, analyst and writer. Barq is fluent in Hindi, Persian, Arabic and Urdu. He began his writing career by writing for Bang-i-Haram, a local daily newspaper. He contributed editorials for Inqelab and Shahbaz. He wrote plays in both Urdu and Pashto for radio and PTV. 

He authored books on Pashtun ethnography and historiography. One of these books, Yadon ke Janaze, is an autobiography. He writes daily columns for Urdu daily Express, Zair-i-lab, which are published by daily Shahbaz. He is known for his humor and satire. Barq has associated with writers such as Qalandar Momand, Dr Raj Wali Shah Khattak, Dr Yar Muhmmad Maghmum Khattak, and Abdur Rahim Majzoob.

Literary works 
Barq's books include: 
 Braikhna
 Baraan
 Gulziarray
 Zaghoona
 Dukhtar-e-Kainaat
 Da Kashmir Ghazi
Yaadon ke Janaze

References

1940 births
Pakistani poets
Living people
Pashtun people
People from Nowshera District